Pathways Out of Poverty (POP) is an American workforce development program that was established on August 14, 2009 by the Obama administration and funded by the American Recovery and Reinvestment Act (ARRA) of 2009. The Department of Labor's Employment and Training Administration announced POP grantees on January 13, 2010. POP targets individuals living below or near the poverty level to provide them with skills needed to enter the green job market, focusing on the energy efficiency and renewable energy industries. The training programs focus on teaching basic literacy and job readiness skills. Some of the programs also provide supportive assistance with childcare and transportation to overcome barriers to employment.

History 
Pathways Out of Poverty is administered by the United States Department of Labor’s Employment and Training Administration.  Roughly $150 million is authorized by the ARRA and is granted in amounts from $2 million-$8 million to eight national and 30 local entities for the provision of training and placement services in order “to provide pathways out of poverty and into employment.” The Department of Labor particularly encouraged applicants to focus on serving Public Micro Data Areas (PUMAs) with poverty rates of 15 percent or higher.

Pathways Out of Poverty is part of the "fourth wave" of economic development, which stipulates an environmentally-sustainable approach.

A principal condition of POP is the training of disadvantaged populations for “employment within energy efficiency and renewable energy industries.” This type of employment is sometimes known as "green jobs" or "green-collar" jobs. As mandated by the POP grant, the grantees primarily target low income individuals, veterans, at-risk youth, high school dropouts, the unemployed and underemployed, ex-criminals, and individuals with limited English ability. In addition, some grantees report recruiting public assistance recipients, the homeless, people with disabilities, older workers, women, minorities, and refugees.

Each grantee is free to choose and make partnerships with any organization, including public, private, and not-for-profit.  Some examples of partners include community colleges, technical schools, faith-based organizations, community-based organizations, and trade groups.

Grantees 
The Department of Labor's Employment and Training Administration announced the 38 national and local organizations that would be receiving grants on January 13, 2010.  The grantees for Pathways Out of Poverty (POP) consist of two types: (1) national non-profits that are connected with local organizations; and (2) local public organizations and private non-profits. 

There are eight national grantees:

There are thirty local grantees:

Locations 
Pathways out of Poverty (POP) grantees are located in 26 states and the District of Columbia. They are primarily located in major metropolitan areas, but some grantees are located in more rural and smaller metropolitan regions. 

The Department of Labor's Employment and Training Administration particularly encouraged applicants to focus on serving Public Micro Data Areas (PUMAs) with poverty rates of 15 percent or higher. Data from the 2009 American Community Survey 1-Year estimates indicates that the PUMAs covered by grantees had an average percentage of inhabitants in poverty that was ten percentage points higher than the national average, at least within the last twelve months. 

In addition, on average, PUMAs covered by grantees have inhabitants with lower levels of education, lower levels of health insurance coverage, and lower levels of English fluency. One barrier to economic development in impoverished areas is lack of skills and education possessed by the inhabitants, which is one rationale for workforce development programs.

Training 
Pathways out of Poverty (POP) grantees proposed providing a variety of services, including sector-based training for green jobs, remedial education and GED help, "soft skills" training, entrepreneurial training, and supportive services. The primary focus of this program is sector-based: grantees are working backwards from specific job categories to design training and place individuals. However, unlike some sector-based programs, POP grantees are enrolling high school dropouts, ex-offenders, and other "harder-to-employ" individuals, as opposed to recruiting more employable individuals. These individuals may require remedial education and GED instruction, which some POP grantees report providing.

Green Jobs Training 
POP grantees are required to train participants for “employment within energy efficiency and renewable energy industries.” Grantees reported training individuals for jobs in the following areas: advanced battery manufacturing, agriculture, forestry, and landscaping, bio-fuel manufacturing and distribution, biofuels, building performance, deconstruction and materials use, energy efficient assessment, energy-efficient building maintenance, energy-efficient building, construction, and retrofit, environmental protection, environmental remediation, recycling, renewable energy and electric power, solar energy, sustainable manufacturing, transportation, waste collection and remediation, water management, and wind energy. 

A 2010 report by the Pew Charitable Trust foundation indicates that green jobs or green-collar jobs are starting to make an impact in the U.S. economy. According to this study, green jobs grew  about two and a half times faster than job growth in the U.S. economy as a whole between 1998 and 2007. Out of the 125 PUMAs that are served by the 38 local and national POP grantees, 75 are located in states that have an average of more than 15,000 green jobs available as well as an average annual growth rate of 1.03 percent in green jobs for the period from 1998 to 2007. In comparison, the average annual growth rate for green jobs nationwide during this period was 0.91 percent, and the average annual growth rate for all jobs nationwide was 0.4 percent.

Other Training Provided 
In order to participate in the program, grantees must provide green jobs training. However, many of the grantees report providing other training and services for their participants in original grant documents. Many participants may need more than green jobs training in order to move out of poverty; "American Recovery and Reinvestment Act of 2009: Pathways Out of Poverty Grants" refers to POP as "integrat[ing] training and supportive services into cohesive programs that will help targeted populations find pathways out of poverty and into economic self-sufficiency." Grantees report providing  apprenticeships, basic and "soft skills" training, remedial education/GED services, English to Speakers of Other Languages instruction, literacy instruction, computer training, entrepreneurship training, and supportive and wraparound services. Additionally, grant documents may not encompass the range of services provided by grantees. 

Since many grantees report recruiting high school dropouts, remedial education and GED services may be required before recruits are able to participate in green jobs training programs requiring at least high school diplomas. Additionally, several grantees report recruiting individuals with low literacy levels and low levels of English fluency, necessitating the provision of literacy instruction and English to Speakers of Other Languages. 

"Soft skills" refers to “dress, language, punctuality, and posture,” as well as other behavioral traits. Some researchers have speculated that lack of these skills forms a greater impediment to employment for disadvantaged individuals than lack of technical 
skills or education. About seventeen of POP grantees explicitly mentioned helping participants with “basic or soft skills.”

Support and wraparound services could include free childcare, assistance with transportation, and counseling. About sixteen grantees listed providing these types of services, although they did not list specific services provided. Research indicates that providing these types of services as part of a workforce development program can help improve program participation and reduce attrition.

Outcomes 
Since grantees were only announced in January 2010, outcomes from this program are not yet fully known. However, grantees listed proposed outcomes in terms of number of participants enrolled, number of individuals to complete training, number of individuals to complete a degree or certificate, and number of individuals to gain employment.

Proposed outcomes from national grantees (in number of individuals):

Proposed outcomes from local grantees (in number of individuals):

References

External links
 Grants.Gov 
 United States Department of Labor 
 The Huffington Post 

Economic development programs
Green jobs
Poverty in the United States
Economic development in the United States